Induction cooking is performed on an electric stove using direct induction heating of cooking vessels, rather than relying on indirect radiation, convection, or thermal conduction. Induction cooking allows high power and very rapid increases in temperature to be achieved: changes in heat settings are instantaneous.

A cooking vessel with a suitable base is placed on an induction stove (also "induction hob" or "induction cooktop") which generally has a heat-proof glass-ceramic surface above a coil of copper wire with a low radio frequency alternating electric current passing through it. The resulting oscillating electromagnetic field induces an electrical current in the vessel. This large eddy current flowing through the resistance of a thin layer of metal in the base of the vessel results in resistive heating.

For nearly all models of induction cooktops, a cooking vessel must be made of, or contain, a ferrous metal such as cast iron or some stainless steels. The iron in the pot concentrates the current to produce heat in the metal. If the metal is too thin, or does not provide enough resistance to current flow, heating will not be effective. Induction tops typically will not heat copper or aluminum vessels because the electromagnetic field cannot produce a concentrated current, but cast iron, enameled, carbon steel and stainless steel pans usually work. Any vessel can be used if placed on a suitable metal disk which functions as a conventional hotplate.

Induction cooking has good electromagnetic coupling between the pan and the coil and is thus quite efficient, which means it puts out less waste heat and it can be quickly turned on and off. Induction has safety advantages compared to gas stoves and outputs no air pollution into the kitchen. Cooktops are also usually easy to clean, because the cooktop itself has a smooth surface and does not get very hot.

Design

Principles

An induction cooker transfers electrical energy by induction from a coil of wire into a metal vessel. The coil is mounted under the cooking surface, and a high frequency (e.g. 24 kHz) alternating current is passed through it. The current in the coil creates a dynamic electromagnetic field. When a suitable electrically conductive pot is brought close to the cooking surface, the electromagnetic field induces large eddy currents in the pot. The coil has many turns, while the bottom of the pot effectively forms a single shorted turn. This forms a transformer that steps down the voltage and steps up the current. This large current flowing through the base of the pot produces heat through Joule heating; the hot pot then in turn heats its contents by heat conduction.

For high efficiency there should be as little electrical resistance in the coil and as much as possible in the pan so that most of the heat is developed in the pan.

At the frequencies typically used in induction cooking (on the order of 25 kHz to 50 kHz), currents flow mostly on the outside of conductors (the skin effect). Reducing the skin effect in the coil reduces its resistance and the heat wasted in the coil. Therefore, the coil is made from litz wire, which is a bundle of many smaller insulated wires woven together in parallel. Litz wire reduces skin effect, and coil resistance, so that the coil stays cool.

Materials 
For induction cooking, the base of a suitable vessel is typically made of a steel or iron. These ferromagnetic materials have a high magnetic permeability which greatly decreases the skin depth, concentrating the current in a very thin layer at the surface of the metal bottom of the pan. This makes the electrical resistance in the pan relatively high, efficiently heating the pan. 

However, for non ferrous metals, such as aluminum, the skin depth in the pans with typical induction cooktops is too large, and thus efficiency with a standard induction cooker is poor: the resistive heating in the coil and pan are similar. This could damage the cooktop, which detects it and rejects the pan.

The heat that can be produced in a pot is a function of the surface resistance. A higher surface resistance produces more heat for similar currents. This is a “figure of merit” that can be used to rank the suitability of a material for induction heating. The surface resistance in a thick metal conductor is proportional to the resistivity divided by the skin depth. Where the thickness is less than the skin depth, the actual thickness can be used to calculate surface resistance.

For some materials, the thickness of a cooking pot can be less than the skin depth, increasing efficiency. For example, typical titanium camping cookware has a thickness (typically around 0.5 mm) around 4 times less than its skin depth at 24 kHz, increasing its efficiency by that factor compared to thick titanium. Less practically, a piece of aluminium foil is typically around 35 times thinner than aluminium's skin depth, so will heat efficiently (and melt quickly).

To get the same surface resistance with copper as with carbon steel would require the metal to be thinner than is practical for a cooking vessel; at 24 kHz a copper vessel bottom would need to be 1/56th the skin depth of carbon steel. Since the skin depth is inversely proportional to the square root of the frequency, this suggests that much higher frequencies would be required to obtain equivalent heating in a copper pot as in an iron pot at 24 kHz. Such high frequencies are not feasible with inexpensive power semiconductors. In 1973 the silicon-controlled rectifiers used were limited to no more than 40 kHz. Even a thin layer of copper on the bottom of a steel cooking vessel will shield the steel from the magnetic field and make it unusable for an induction top. In ferrous materials some additional heat is created by hysteresis losses, but this creates less than ten percent of the total heat generated.

New types of power semiconductors and low-loss coil designs have made an all-metal cooker possible which can be used with any metal pot or pan even if not designed for induction. Panasonic in 2009 developed a consumer induction cooker that uses a higher-frequency magnetic field of 60 kHz or higher, and a different oscillator circuit design, to allow use with non-ferrous metals as well, including aluminum, multilayer and copper pots and pans. In 2017 Panasonic released a single-burner counter top "all metal" unit, using their trade name "Met-All", aimed at commercial kitchens.

Cooking properties

Power and control
Induction cooking provides fast heating, improved thermal efficiency, and more consistent heating than cooking by thermal conduction. Generally, the higher the power rating, the faster the cooking time. Induction cooktop power ratings are generally quoted for power delivered to the pan, whereas gas ratings are specified in terms of gas use, but gas is much less efficient. In practice, induction cook zones commonly have heating performance more comparable to a commercial gas burner than domestic burners.

Often a thermostat is present to measure the temperature of the pan. This helps prevent the pan from severely overheating if accidentally heated empty or boiled dry, but some models can allow the induction cooker to maintain a target temperature.

Safety
The pan is insulated by the cooking surface, and voltages generated in the pan are far too low to represent a shock hazard.

The cooktop can detect whether cookware is present by monitoring power delivered. As with other electric ceramic cooking surfaces, a maximum pan size may be specified by the manufacturer, and a minimum size is also stated.

The control system shuts down the element if a pot is not present or not large enough. If a pan boils dry it can get extremely hot – a thermostat in the surface will turn off the power if it senses overheating to prevent cooker failures and potential fires.

Cooker surface
Induction cooker tops are generally a low-thermal expansion glass-ceramic. The surface of the cooker is heated only by the pot and so does not usually reach a high temperature. The thermal conductivity of glass ceramics is poor so the heat does not spread far. Induction cookers are easy to clean because the cooking surface is flat and smooth and does not usually get hot enough to make spilled food burn and stick.

The surface is brittle and can be damaged by sufficient impact although they must meet specified impact standards. Aluminum foil can melt onto the top and cause permanent damage or cracking of the top. Surfaces can be scratched by sliding pans across the cooking surface.

Noise
Noise is generated by an internal cooling fan. Also, audible electromagnetically induced acoustic noise (a high-pitched hum or buzz) may be produced, especially at high power, if the cookware has loose parts or if the layers of the pot are not well bonded to each other; cookware with welded-in cladding layers and solid riveting is less likely to produce this type of noise. Some users are more capable of hearing (or more sensitive to) this high-frequency sound.

Other considerations
Some cooking techniques available when cooking over a flame are not applicable. Persons with implanted cardiac pacemakers or other electronic medical implants are usually instructed to avoid sources of magnetic fields; the medical literature seems to suggest that proximity to induction cooking surfaces is safe, but individuals with such implants should check with their cardiologists. Radio receivers near the induction-cooking unit may pick up some electromagnetic interference.

Because the cooktop is shallow compared to a gas-fired or electrical coil cooking surface, wheelchair access can be improved; the user's legs can fit below the counter height while the user's arms reach over the top.

Efficiency

The 2014 ACEEE Summer Study on Energy Efficiency in Buildings concluded that "induction cooking is not always the most efficient method of cooking. When tested with a large cooking vessel, the efficiency of conventional electric technology was measured to be higher (83%) than that of induction cooking (77%). Yet the
efficiency of conventional cooking appliances was shown to be highly dependent on the size of the cooking vessel." Cooking methods that use flames or hot heating elements have a significantly higher loss to the ambient environment; induction heating directly heats the pot. Because the induction effect does not directly heat the air around the vessel, induction cooking results in further energy efficiencies. Cooling air is blown through the electronics beneath the surface but it is only slightly warm.

The purpose of a cooktop is to prepare food; for example, long periods of simmering may be required. Published energy efficiency measurements concentrate on the ability of a cooktop to transfer energy to a metal test block, which is easier to repeatably measure.

Energy transfer efficiency, as defined by U.S. Department of Energy (DOE), is the percentage of the energy consumed by a cooker that, at the end of a simulated cooking cycle has been transferred as heat to a standardized aluminum test block.

The DOE test cycle starts with both the block and the cooktop at 77 °F ± 9 °F (25 °C ± 5 °C). The cooktop is then switched to maximum heating power. When the test block temperature reaches 144 °F (80 °C) above the initial room temperature, the cooktop power is immediately reduced to 25% ± 5% of its maximum power. After 15 minutes of operation at this lower power setting, the cooktop is turned off and the heat energy in the test block is measured. Efficiency is given by the ratio between energy in the block and input (electric) energy.

Such a test, using two power levels, is intended to mimic real life use. Wasted energy terms such as residual unused heat (retained by solid hot-plates, ceramic or coil at the end of the test), and losses from convection and radiation by hot surfaces (including the ones of the block itself) are disregarded.

In typical cooking, the energy delivered by the cooker is only partly used to heat the food; once that has occurred, all the subsequent energy input is delivered to the air as loss through steam or convection and radiation. Without an increase in food temperature, the DOE test procedure would find the efficiency to be zero. Cooking procedures such as reduction of a sauce, braising meat, simmering, and so on are significant uses of a cooker, but efficiency of these practices is not modelled by the procedure.

In 2013 and 2014 DOE developed and proposed new test procedures to allow direct comparison of energy transfer efficiency among induction, electric resistance, and gas cooking tops and ranges. The procedures use a new hybrid test block made of aluminum and stainless steel. The proposed rule lists results of real lab tests conducted with the hybrid block. For comparable (large) cooking elements the following efficiencies were measured with ±0.5% repeatability: 70.7% - 73.6% for induction, 71.9% for electric coil, 43.9% for gas. DOE affirmed that "induction units have an average efficiency of 72.2%, not significantly higher than the 69.9% efficiency of smooth—electric resistance units, or the 71.2% of electric coil units". DOE noted that the 84% induction efficiency, cited in previous Technical Support Documents, was not measured by DOE laboratories, but just "referenced from an external test study" performed in 1992.

Independent manufacturers tests and other subjects seem to demonstrate that actual induction cooking efficiencies usually stay between 74% and 77% and occasionally reach 81% (although these tests may follow different procedures). These clues indicate that the 84% induction average efficiency reference value should be taken with caution.

For comparison and in agreement with DOE findings, cooking with gas has an average energy efficiency of about 40%. It can be raised only by using special pots with fins.

When comparing with gas, the relative cost of electrical and gas energy, and the efficiency of electricity generation affect overall environmental efficiency and user cost.

Ventilation
Energy lost from gas cooking heats the kitchen, whereas with induction cooking, energy losses are much lower. This results in less heating of the kitchen and reduces the required amount of ventilation. Gas stoves are a significant source of indoor air pollution.

Gas cooking efficiencies are lower once waste heat generation is taken into account. Especially in restaurants, gas cooking can significantly increase air temperature in localized areas. Extra cooling and zoned venting may be needed to adequately condition hot areas without overcooling other areas.

In a commercial setting, induction cookers do not require safety interlocks between the fuel source and the ventilation, as may be required with gas systems.

Applications

Induction equipment may be a built-in surface, part of a range, or a standalone surface unit. Built-in and rangetop units typically have multiple elements, the equivalent of multiple burners on a gas-fueled range. Stand-alone induction modules are typically single-or dual-element. All such elements share an electromagnet sealed beneath a heat-resisting glass-ceramic sheet. The pot is placed on the ceramic glass surface and heats its contents.

Asian manufacturers have taken the lead in producing inexpensive single-induction-zone surfaces. In Japan, some models of rice cookers are powered by induction. Induction cookers are less frequently used in other parts of the world.

Induction ranges may be applicable in commercial restaurant kitchens, with lower installation, ventilation and fire suppression equipment costs. Drawbacks for commercial use include possible breakages of the glass cook-top, higher initial cost and the requirement for magnetic cookware.

Controls

Some units have touch-sensitive controls. Some have a memory setting, one per element, to control the time that heat is applied. At least one manufacturer makes a "zoneless" induction cooking surface with multiple induction coils. This allows up to five pots to be used at once anywhere on the cooking surface, rather than in pre-defined spots.

Cookware

Cookware must be compatible with induction heating; generally, only ferrous metal can be heated. Cookware should have a flat bottom since the magnetic field strength (heating power) drops rapidly with distance from the surface. (Wok-shaped cooktops are available for use with round-bottom woks.) Induction disks are metal plates that are heated by induction and heat non-ferrous pots by thermal contact, but these are much less efficient than ferrous cooking vessels.

Induction-compatible cookware can nearly always be used on other stoves. Some cookware or packaging is marked with symbols to indicate compatibility with induction, gas, or electric heat. Induction cooking surfaces work well with any pans with a high ferrous metal content at the base. Cast iron pans and any black metal or iron pans are compatible. Stainless steel pans are compatible if the base of the pan is a magnetic grade of stainless steel. If a magnet sticks well to the bottom of the pan, it is compatible. Non-ferrous cookware is compatible with "all-metal" cookers.

Aluminum and copper are desirable in cookware, since they conduct heat better. Because of this, 'tri-ply' pans often have an induction-compatible skin of stainless steel containing a layer of thermally conductive aluminum.

For frying, a pan base must be a good heat conductor to spread heat quickly and evenly. The sole of the pan will be either a steel plate pressed into aluminum, or a layer of stainless steel over the aluminum. Aluminum's high thermal conductivity makes the temperature more uniform across the pan. Stainless frying pans with an aluminum base do not have the same temperature at their sides as an aluminum sided pan. Cast iron frying pans work well with induction cooking surfaces, although the material is not as good a thermal conductor as aluminum.

When boiling water, the water circulates, spreading the heat and preventing hot spots. For products such as sauces, it is important that at least the base of the pan incorporates a good heat conducting material to spread the heat evenly. For delicate products such as thick sauces, a pan with aluminum throughout is better, since the heat flows up the sides through the aluminum, evenly heating the sauce.

History
The first patents were issued in the early 1900s. Demonstration stoves were shown by the Frigidaire division of General Motors in the mid-1950s on a touring showcase. The induction cooker was shown heating a pot of water with a newspaper placed between the stove and the pot, to demonstrate the convenience and safety. This unit was never put into production.

Modern implementations came in the early 1970s, with work done at the Research & Development Center of Westinghouse Electric Corporation. That work was first put on display at the 1971 National Association of Home Builders convention in Houston, Texas, as part of the Westinghouse Consumer Products Division display. The stand-alone single-burner range was named the Cool Top Induction Range. It used parallel Delco Electronics transistors developed for automotive electronic ignition systems to drive the 25 kHz current.

Westinghouse decided to make a few hundred production units to develop the market. Those were named Cool Top 2 (CT2) Induction ranges. The development work was done by a team led by Bill Moreland and Terry Malarkey. The ranges were priced at $1,500 ($8,260 in 2017 dollars), including a set of high quality cookware made of Quadraply, a new laminate of stainless steel, carbon steel, aluminum and another layer of stainless steel (outside to inside). Production began  in 1973 and stopped in 1975.

CT2 had four "burners" of about 1,600 watts each. The surface was a Pyroceram ceramic sheet surrounded by a stainless-steel bezel, upon which four magnetic sliders adjusted four corresponding potentiometers below. That design, using no through-holes, made the range impervious to spills. The electronics section was made of four identical modules cooled by a single quiet, low-speed, high-torque fan.

In each of the electronics modules, the 240 V, 60 Hz domestic line power was converted to between 20 V to 200 V of continuously variable DC by a phase-controlled rectifier. That DC power was in turn converted to 27 kHz 30 A (peak) AC by two arrays of six paralleled Motorola automotive-ignition transistors in a half-bridge configuration driving a series-resonant LC oscillator, of which the inductor component was the induction-heating coil and its load, the cooking pan. The circuit design, largely by Ray Mackenzie, successfully dealt with overload problems.

Control electronics included functions such as protection against over-heated cook-pans and overloads. Provision was made to reduce radiated electrical and magnetic fields. Magnetic pan detection was provided.

CT2 was UL Listed and received Federal Communications Commission (FCC) approval, both firsts. Numerous patents were issued. CT2 won several awards, including Industrial Research Magazine's IR-100 1972 best-product award  and a citation from the United States Steel Association. Raymond Baxter demonstrated the CT2 on the BBC series Tomorrow's World. He showed how the CT2 could cook through a slab of ice.

Sears Kenmore sold a free-standing oven/stove with four induction-cooking surfaces in the mid-1980s (Model Number 103.9647910). The unit also featured a self-cleaning oven, solid-state kitchen timer and capacitive-touch control buttons (advanced for its time). The units were more expensive than standard cooking surfaces.

In 2009 Panasonic developed an all-metal induction cooker that used frequencies up to 120 kHz, three to five times higher than other cooktops, to work with non-ferrous metal cookware.

Vendors

The market for induction stoves is dominated by German manufacturers.

Single ring portable hobs became popular in the UK, with prices as low as £30.

The European induction cooking market for hotels, restaurants and other caterers is primarily satisfied by smaller specialist commercial induction catering equipment manufacturers.

Taiwanese and Japanese electronics companies are the dominant players in induction cooking for East Asia. After aggressive promotions by utilities in HK, many local brands emerged. Their power and ratings are more than 2,800 watts. Some of these companies market in the West.

In the United States, as of early 2013 over five dozen brands offered induction-cooking equipment, including both built-in and countertop residential equipment and commercial-grade equipment. Over two dozen brands offer built-in residential-use units; residential countertop units are offered by two-dozen-plus brands.

The National Association of Home Builders in 2012 estimated that, in the United States, induction cooktops represented only 4% of sales, compared to gas and other electric cooktops. The global induction cooktops market was estimated at $9.16 billion in value during 2015.

In April 2010, The New York Times reported that "In an independent survey [in 2009] by the market research company Mintel of 2,000 Internet users who own appliances, only 5 percent of respondents said they had an induction range or cooktop. Still, 22 percent of the people Mintel surveyed in connection to their study [in 2009] said their next range or cooktop would be induction."

See also

 Glass-ceramic
 Microwave oven
 Electrodeless lamp

References

External links

Cooking appliances
Electromagnetic components